is a general aviation airport in Yao, Osaka Prefecture, Japan.

Several small carriers offer sightseeing and charter flights from Yao, including Asahi Airlines and Hankyu Airlines.

Yao is the only second class airport in Japan that does not have scheduled airline services.

History
The airport started as Hanshin Aviation School in 1938. Two years later the airfield was seized by the army as the Taishō Airfield and expanded. After World War II, the occupation forces called it the Hanshin Airfield before it was returned to Japanese control.

Operations

Self-Defense Forces
The Japan Ground Self-Defense Force operates a base at the airport, . Units based at Camp Yao include:

 - UH-1 and OH-1 transport/observation helicopters

 - UH-1 and OH-6 transport/observation helicopters

Osaka Prefecture

The Osaka Prefectural Fire Department operates two Eurocopter AS365 Dauphin helicopters from Yao. They are primarily used for firefighting within Osaka, but were dispatched overseas to assist with the 1991 Bangladesh cyclone and the 2004 Indian Ocean earthquake and tsunami.

References

Transport in Osaka Prefecture
Airports in Japan
Buildings and structures in Osaka Prefecture
Japan Ground Self-Defense Force bases
Yao, Osaka